Last Day Parade was a hardcore rock band from Albuquerque, New Mexico.

The band released several recordings on Philadelphia's Kickstart Audio, distributed by Sunset Alliance Records. The group's music drew comparisons to At the Drive-In and Cap'n Jazz.

Since its break-up, some members of Last Day Parade formed the new band August Spies.

Discography

References

External links
 Sunset Alliance Records

Musical groups established in 1999
Musical groups disestablished in 2001
Rock music groups from New Mexico
1999 establishments in New Mexico